Guy's Grocery Games is an elimination cooking game show that is hosted by Guy Fieri.  It airs on the Food Network and Food Network Canada.

Series overview

Episodes

Season 1 (2013–14)

Season 2 (2014)

From this season forward, the show moved filming to a new, specially built supermarket set located in a warehouse in Santa Rosa, CA. This season had some episodes that were produced during Season 3 production but was carried over to this season.

Season 3 (2014)

Season 4 (2015)

The shopping spree format was tweaked with contestants no longer being able to pick and choose which item on the list to grab. Starting in aisle 1 and ending at aisle 10, they had 2 minutes to find 10 items, winning $2,000 for every item they got into their cart. If they couldn't find an item, they were allowed to skip it and move on to the next aisle.

Season 5 (2015)

Season 6 (2015)

Season 7 (2015)

Season 8 (2016)

Season 9 (2016)

Season 10 (2016)

Season 11 (2016)

Season 12 (2017)

Season 13 (2017)

Season 14 (2017)

Season 15 (2017/2018)

Season 16 (2018)

Season 17

Season 18 (2018)

Season 19

Season 20 (2019)

Season 21 (2019)

Season 22 (2019-20)

Season 23 (2020)

Season 24 (2020)

Season 25 (2020)

Season 26 (2021)

Season 27 (2021)

Season 28 (2021)

Season 29 (2022)

Season 30 (2022)

Season 31 (2022-23)

Season 32 (2023)

This is the current season now airing.

References

Guy's Grocery Games